Mordellistena luteofasciata is a beetle in the genus Mordellistena of the family Mordellidae. It was described in 1962 by Karl Friedrich Ermisch.

References

luteoapicipennis
Beetles described in 1962